Criminalz is an American rap group that consists of West Coast rappers Spice 1 and Celly Cel.  The group was thrown together in hope of creating a supergroup of hard West Coast rappers by a couple of record labels in California.  The group released their debut album, Criminal Activity in 2001 for Realside Records.  The album found only limited success, making it to number 57 on the Top R&B/Hip-Hop album charts and number 26 on the Independent album charts.  A second album, Criminal Intent, is expected to be released in 2008.

Discography

Hip hop groups from California
Gangsta rap groups